The 1st constituency of Réunion is a French legislative constituency on the island of Réunion. As of 2022, it is represented by Philippe Naillet and Socialist Party deputy.

Deputies

Election results

2022

 
 
|-
| colspan="8" bgcolor="#E9E9E9"|
|-

2017

2012

References

1